Japan sent 41 athletes to the 14th IAAF World Championships in Moscow, Russia. The Japan team were announced by the Japan Association of Athletics Federations after the 2013 Japan Championships in Athletics.

Medallists

Team selection

Track and road events

Field and combined events

Women 
Track & road events 

Field

References
  . Japan Association of Athletics Federations. Retrieved 4 July 2013.

Nations at the 2013 World Championships in Athletics
World Championships in Athletics
Japan at the World Championships in Athletics